Nena is a given name, nickname and sometimes a surname. It is an English and Spanish feminine given name that is a diminutive form of Antonina and Giannina and thus an alternate form of Nina used in United States, most of Canada, Mexico, Guatemala, Honduras, Nicaragua, El Salvador, Costa Rica, Western Panama, Cuba, Dominican Republic, Colombia, Venezuela, Guyana, Ecuador, Peru, Chile, Bolivia, Argentina, Uruguay, Paraguay, Falkland Islands, Australia, New Zealand, Papua New Guinea, Philippines, Peninsular Malaysia, Singapore, India, Pakistan, Spain, England, Wales, Scotland, Northern Ireland, Republic of Ireland, Guyana, Liberia, Sierra Leone, Ghana, Namibia, South Africa, Botswana, Zimbabwe, Zambia, Malawi, Tanzania, Uganda, Kenya, Sudan, South Sudan, Ethiopia, Cameroon and Nigeria. It is also an Afroasiatic feminine given name used throughout Africa and a South Slavic feminine short form of Nevenka and Nevena used in Slovenia as a given name and in other South Slavic countries as a nickname. People bearing it include:

Given name
 Nena Danevic, film editor nominated for her work on Amadeus
 Nena de Brennecke (1883 – ??), Argentinean sculptor and mural painter
 Nena Jolidon Croake (1865-1934), American politician
 Nena Lekovic, Serbian songwriter
 Nena Kalu Ogba, birthname of Ogba Kalu Nnanna (born 1984), male Nigerian footballer

Nickname
 Nena, stagename of Gabriele Susanne Kerner, (born 1960), German singer
 Nena (footballer, born 1923) (1923–2010), nickname of Olavo Rodrigues Barbosa, Brazilian footballer
 Nena Baltazar, nickname of Tania Baltazar Lugones, Bolivian environmentalist
 Nena Cardenas, born Remy Cardenas, Filipina actress
 Nena Peragallo, nickname of Nilda Peragallo Montano, professor of nursing
 Nena von Schlebrügge nickname of Birgitte Caroline von Schlebrügge, Mexican fashion model and mother of Uma Thurman

Surname
Jacob Nena (born 1941), Micronesian politician

Fictional characters
 Nena Bismaquer, a character in the John Gardner novel For Special Services
 Nena Trinity, a fictional character from Mobile Suit Gundam 00

See also

Nela (name)
Neno (name)
Nina (name)
 Extra Nena aka Snežana Berić, a Serbian singer known for Ljubim te pesmama
 Neneh Cherry, a Swedish singer-songwriter and rapper
 Dom La Nena, stage name of Dominique Pinto, (born 1989), Brazilian-born cellist, singer and songwriter
 Nena Daconte, Spanish pop group

Name

English feminine given names
Slovene feminine given names
Spanish feminine given names